Enugu South is a Local Government Area of Enugu State, Nigeria. Its headquarters are in the town of Uwani, Nnobi Street Enugu, and covers the communities of Akwuke, Amechi, Ugwuaji, Obeagu, Awkunanaw and Amechi-Uwani. Enugu South is bounded to the north by Enugu North and to the east by Nkanu East local government areas. It falls within the Eastern senatorial districts of Enugu.  
 
It has an area of 67 km and a population of 198,723 at the 2006 census, and is put to be 267,300 according to 2016 population projection. Majority of the population are from Igbo ethnic group, thus Igbo and English are the major languages in Enugu South.
The LGA is also rich in Agriculture

The postal code of the area is 400.

Geography 
Enugu South covers a land area of 67 square kilometers and has an average yearly temperature of 27 °C. The area experience average humidity of 69%, while the LGA has two major seasons which are the dry and the rainy seasons with a brief harmattan period during the dry season.

Landmarks in the area include among others, the Roban stores shopping Mall in Agbani road, the Holy Rosary College and the Ngwo relaxation park.

Economy 
Enugu South local government (just like Enugu City) has a vast deposits of coal and thus is part of the area being referred to as the "Coal City". The area is also famous in the cultivation of food and cash crops such as maize, yam and cassava.
The local government is also a home to many open markets such as is the Kenyatta market and the Mayor market.

Government 
Enugu South is a local government area in Enugu state which serves as the lower tier of government in the state. It is chaired by Hon. Monday E. Eneh as the executive chairman, Hon. Sandra Akuabata Onyia as the Deputy Chairman Enugu South L.G.A and Rt. Hon. Onyemaechi Ani as the Leader Enugu South legislative council.

Administrative Sub-division 
Enugu South LGA comprises the following districts;
 Awkunanaw
 Akwuke
 Amechi
 Ugwuaji
 Obeagu
 Amechi-Uwani

Wards 
The following wards make up the Enugu South LGA;

 Achara Layout East
 Achara Layout West
 Akwuke
 Amechi I
 Amechi Ii
 Awkunanaw East
 Awkunanaw West
 Maryland
 Obeagu I
 Obeagu Ii
 Ugwuaji
 Uwani East
 Uwani West

towns and villages

Religion 
A Majority of the population of Enugu South LGA are Christians.

References

Local Government Areas in Enugu State
Enugu
Local Government Areas in Igboland